Neo-medieval (Greek neo - 'new' + medieval) refers to a modern revival of Medieval culture.
Neo-medieval music
Revival of medieval architecture, i.e., Revivalism (architecture)#Medieval Revival
Neo-medievalism